Graham Kay (born Graham Keay) is a Canadian stand-up comedian.He was nominated for a 2013 Canadian Comedy Award for Best Breakout Artist, and was runner-up at the 2013 Seattle International Comedy Competition. Kay has appeared on HLN's Dr. Drew On Call, CBC Television's George Stroumboulopoulos Tonight, and MuchMusic's Video On Trial. Kay appeared in the feature film Super Troopers 2, which premiered in April 2018. He made his network television debut in November 2018 when he performed on The Late Show with Stephen Colbert. In 2019, he competed in the American reality television comedy competition series Bring the Funny'', making it to the first round (the "Open Mic").

References

External links 
 Graham Kay's Official Website

Canadian stand-up comedians
Comedians from Ontario
Living people
Canadian comedy writers
Writers from Ottawa
Year of birth missing (living people)
Bring the Funny contestants